Vítor Manuel Pereira (born 18 January 1953 in Barreiro, Setúbal District) is a Portuguese former footballer who played as a midfielder.

External links

1953 births
Living people
Sportspeople from Barreiro, Portugal
Portuguese footballers
Association football midfielders
Primeira Liga players
Liga Portugal 2 players
G.D. Fabril players
Boavista F.C. players
S.C. Espinho players
A.D. Sanjoanense players
Portugal youth international footballers
Portugal under-21 international footballers
Portugal international footballers